"Alas That My Lot Was Not Cast" or "Ai shi ming" is one of the poems anthologized in the ancient Chinese poetry collection, the Chu ci; which, together with the Shijing comprise the two major textual sources for ancient Chinese poetry. "Alas That My Lot Was Not Cast" is an example of the Sao type of Chu ci poetry, in the "O tempora o mores!" vein. The authorship of the "Alas That My Lot Was Not Cast" poem has been attributed to Zhuang Ji (also known as Yan Ji). (Hawkes, 2011 [1985]: 262)

See also
Chuci
List of Chuci contents
Qu Yuan
Weak River (mythology)
Xian (Taoism)
Zhuang Ji
惜誓

References
Hawkes, David, translator and introduction (2011 [1985]). Qu Yuan et al., The Songs of the South: An Ancient Chinese Anthology of Poems by Qu Yuan and Other Poets. London: Penguin Books. 

Chinese poems